Joseph Holt (1807–1894) was a Union Army brigadier general. General Holt may also refer to:

Cameron Holt (fl. 1990s–2020s), U.S. Air Force major general
Felton Holt (1886–1931), Royal Air Force brigadier general
Maurice Holt (1862–1954), British Army major general
William G. Holt (fl. 1990s–2020s), U.S. Air Force major general